Perrault LaRue (31 March 1925, Amqui, Quebec – 8 November 1987) was a Progressive Conservative party member of the House of Commons of Canada. He was a dentist by career.

He was elected at the Saguenay riding in the 1958 general election and served only one term, the 24th Canadian Parliament. LaRue did not seek re-election to Parliament after this.

External links
 

1925 births
1987 deaths
Canadian dentists
Members of the House of Commons of Canada from Quebec
Progressive Conservative Party of Canada MPs
People from Amqui
20th-century dentists